Gaylord Lloyd (March 20, 1888 – September 1, 1943) was an actor and assistant director, known for Dodge Your Debts (1921), Trolley Troubles (1921) and Why Worry? (1923). He was the older brother of actor Harold Lloyd. He was married to Barbara Starr. He was born in Burchard, Nebraska, and died in Beverly Hills, Los Angeles, California.

He and his more famous brother looked very much alike, which allowed Gaylord to occasionally serve as a double for Harold.  In the 1920 comedy His Royal Slyness, Gaylord played a prince while Harold played a lookalike American commoner.

Partial filmography
 Luke's Double  (1916)
 The Big Idea (1917)
 Hit Him Again (1918)
 The Marathon (1919)
 Just Neighbors (1919) - Man in Line at Bank (uncredited)
 Start Something (1919)
 Bumping Into Broadway (1919) (uncredited)
 Giving the Bride Away (1919)
 Order in the Court (1919)
 It's a Hard Life (1919)
 How Dry I Am (1919)
 His Royal Slyness (1920)
 High and Dizzy (1920) (uncredited)
 Haunted Spooks (1920) (uncredited)
 Get Out and Get Under (1920) (uncredited)
 Number, Please? (1920) (uncredited)
 Now or Never (1921) (uncredited)
 Among Those Present (1921) (uncredited)
 Trolley Troubles (1921)
 Never Weaken (1921) (uncredited)
 Grandma's Boy  (1922)
 Why Worry? (1923)
 Do Your Stuff (1923)
 Pay the Cashier (1926)
 Meet the Folks (1927)

References

External links
 
 
 Gaylord Lloyd

1888 births
1943 deaths
American male silent film actors
20th-century American male actors
Burials at Forest Lawn Memorial Park (Glendale)
Male actors from Nebraska
People from Burchard, Nebraska